Poshteh Zang (also Romanized as Poshteh Zong; also known as Poshteh Zānak, Poshteh Zerang, and Pusht-i-Zunk) is a village in Hanza Rural District, Hanza District, Rabor County, Kerman Province, Iran. At the 2006 census, its population was 108, in 23 families.

References 

Populated places in Rabor County